Network Awesome was an online TV broadcasting outlet launched by electronic musician Jason Forrest and co-founder Greg Sadetsky  on January 1, 2011.

Network Awesome also includes a magazine with the goal of providing commentary and analysis of the featured content via daily articles. The magazine is syndicated by Huffington Post and DigBoston.

Since August 23, 2018 the site is inactive and no longer allows access to the site's content, showing a "stay tuned!" message on the homepage.

As of November 25, 2020 the site is completely inaccessible.

Notes

External links
Official website
Network Awesome magazine
"Network Awesome is here to remind us what television was like before it sucked" Denver Westword, July 20, 2011
"Network Awesome is like TV Land for the Online set" Gigaom.com, February 10, 2011
"Geeked: Network Awesome" Digboston.com, January 27, 2011
"Behind Network Awesome - An interview with Jason Forrest" Mediageek.net, August 29, 2011
"Network Awesome's Women of Punk week: Trashing of the Troubadour" Los Angeles Times, July 22, 2011
"No Wave" "Dangerous Minds," 2012

Internet television channels